Eleanor Jane Miller Laino (March 10, 1948 – November 16, 2021) was an American poet, author of Girl Hurt (Alice James Books, 1995). She has a new collection, Cracking Open, forthcoming. Her honors include a Vermont Studio Center fellowship and the 1996 American Book Award, and her work has appeared in literary journals and magazines including The American Poetry Review, New York Quarterly, and Poetry East. She was educated at the University of Massachusetts Amherst and Fitchburg State College, and lived in Key West and taught at Florida Keys Community College.

Honors and awards
 1996 American Book Award for Girl Hurt
 Prairie Schooner Readers' Choice Award

Published works

Full-length poetry collections

Anthologies edited

References

External links
 Author Page: Alice James Books > E.J. Miller Laino

1948 births
2021 deaths
American women poets
People from Key West, Florida
Poets from Florida
University of Massachusetts Amherst alumni
Fitchburg State University alumni
American Book Award winners
21st-century American women